Trimingham is a surname. Notable people with the surname include:

DeForest Wheeler Trimingham (1919–2007), Bermudian sailor
Ernest Trimingham (1880–1942), Bermudian actor
J. Spencer Trimingham (1904-1987), British missionary and scholar of Islam
Jim Trimingham, American politician

English-language surnames